Cagnet is a soulful pop and R&B group that has become very successful in Japan due to their contributions to drama soundtracks like Long Vacation and Love Generation. Although they were established in Santa Monica, California, United States, their debut was in Japan.

Band members

 Anna McMurphy - lead vocals
 Natalie Burks - backing vocals
 Rowan Robertson - guitars
 Jimi Paxson - drums
 Perry Frank - bass
 Daisuke Hinata - synthesizer, producer, composer

Discography 
"Long Vacation" (soundtrack to the Japanese drama Long Vacation)
Here We Are Again – Long Vacation (album of Long Vacation)
"Deeper and Deeper"
"Groove Radio"
"Rage in the Sky"
"Love Generation"
Best of Cagnet World
"Cagnet Generation"
Cagnet Music Generation
"King of Comedy"
"Love Story"

References

External links
Hyperdisc Records

Musical groups from California
American pop music groups
American contemporary R&B musical groups